Kristian Hornsleth (born 1963) is a Danish conceptual artist, who has exhibited in the Stalke Galleri. He is the postmodern artist behind the controversial Hornsleth Village Project, wherein  340 Ugandan villagers were paid in livestock to legally change their names to Hornsleth. He is currently working on the Deep Storage Project.

Copyright row
In September 2009 the largest Danish newspaper Jyllands-Posten revealed that Hornsleth on several occasions has used photographs taken by the photographer Platon Antoniou without permission. Reproductions of his paintings were sold in several Danish ILVA shops but was withdrawn after it was clear that Hornsleth violated Platon's rights. Hornsleth also withdrew all his paintings from his website that showed that he in several paintings had used photographs of Pamela Anderson and Bill Clinton taken by Platon without permission. A large part of his more than 1000 paintings include uncredited photographs and it is believed that a huge part of his production builds on illegal photograph use.

References

Danish artists
Danish contemporary artists
1963 births
Living people